Liolaemus melanopleurus is a species of lizard in the family Iguanidae.  It is found in Chile.

References

melanopleurus
Lizards of South America
Reptiles of Chile
Endemic fauna of Chile
Reptiles described in 1860
Taxa named by Rodolfo Amando Philippi